The 1850 Delaware gubernatorial election was held on November 5, 1850. Incumbent Democratic Governor William Tharp was unable to seek re-election. Banker William H. H. Ross ran as the Democratic nominee to succeed Tharp and he faced former State Representative Peter F. Causey, the 1846 Whig nominee, and Temperance nominee Thomas Lockwood. Ross defeated Causey by a narrow margin, winning by just 23 votes and falling short of a majority.

General election

Results

References

Bibliography
 
 
 

1850
Delaware
Gubernatorial